Dowland is a civil parish in Devon, situated near Winkleigh. It is also the name of a hamlet in the parish.

References

Hamlets in Devon
Civil parishes in Devon
Torridge District